= Sophie Otiende =

Kenyan activist

- Occupation: Human trafficking activist

Sophie Otiende is a Kenyan activist and advocate for survivors of human trafficking. She is a former board member of the Global Fund to End Modern Slavery. She is currently the Chief Executive Officer at the Global Fund to End Modern Slavery (GFEMS) and the founder of one of the first survivor-led collectives in Kenya, Azadi. She is widely known for her activism on human trafficking, specifically for her work on standards of care for survivors of trafficking and for her advocacy for the inclusion of survivors of trafficking in the sector. Since 2014, she has been responsible for identifying and restoring over 400 victims of human trafficking. Otiende has also drafted curriculum for training on human trafficking and support for victims of trafficking.

In 2020, Otiende was shortlisted as one of the Trafficking in Persons Report Heroes of 2020 by the United States Department of State.
